Bullets for O'Hara is a 1941 American drama film directed by William K. Howard, written by Raymond L. Schrock, and starring Joan Perry, Roger Pryor, Anthony Quinn, Maris Wrixon, Dick Purcell and Richard Ainley. It was released by Warner Bros. on July 19, 1941.

Plot
Offered the home of her well-to-do friends the Standishes for her Florida honeymoon, newlywed Patricia Van Dyne is astonished when her husband Tony promptly robs the place. Tony forces her to go along on a train bound for Chicago, then abandons Pat before the waiting police led by Mike O'Hara can nab him.

O'Hara arrests her, skeptical of Pat's claim that she had nothing to do with the theft. Once she is cleared of the charges, Pat immediately seeks a divorce from Tony. A scheme is hatched, Mike pretending to marry Pat himself to lure Tony out of hiding. Tony lets them go through with the wedding, then snatches Pat and Mike and takes them to the Florida Keys.

Pat is able to have a note delivered to the police, who come to her rescue. Mike apologizes for the confusion and says he will quickly grant her a divorce. Pat says that won't be necessary.

Cast 
Joan Perry as Patricia Van Dyne
Roger Pryor as Mike O'Hara
Anthony Quinn as Tony Van Dyne
Maris Wrixon as Elaine Standish
Dick Purcell as Wicks
Richard Ainley as McKay Standish
Hobart Bosworth as Judge
William Hopper as Richard Palmer 
Joan Winfield as Marjorie Palmer
Roland Drew as Bradford
Joe King as Maxwell 
Victor Zimmerman as Steve
Hank Mann as Swartzman
Kenneth Harlan as Jim
Frank Mayo as Weldon
Jack Mower as G-Man
Sidney Bracey as Lamson
Leah Baird as Police Matron

References

External links 
 

1941 films
Warner Bros. films
American drama films
1941 drama films
Films directed by William K. Howard
American black-and-white films
1940s English-language films
1940s American films
Films scored by Bernhard Kaun
Films about honeymoon
Films about divorce
Films about robbery
Films set in Florida